Guy XVI, Count of Laval, Mayenne (1 October 1476 – 20 May 1531) was a member of the House of Laval.  He was christened Nicolas, but upon inheriting the title, he took the required name of Guy, as his predecessors had done.  He was the son of Jean de Laval, who was the brother of Guy XV and the son of Guy XIV and Isabella of Brittany.

Career and court 
He was born Nicolas de Laval, lord of La Roche-Bernard.  He spent much of his youth at the court of his kinsman, Francis II, Duke of Brittany, where he became close with the Duke's daughter, Anne.  When Francis died and Anne married Charles VIII of France, Nicolas followed her to the royal court, where they remained close.  The queen became godmother to his daughter Anne.

Guy XVI served the Kings of France with distinction throughout his career.  This included service as the Lieutenant General (from 1517), Governor (from 1525), and Admiral of Brittany, where many of his lands were.  Guy XVI frequently corresponded with his brother-in-law, Anne de Montmorency to gain insight and favors at the royal court.

Guy XVI maintained a large court of lesser nobles from throughout France and beyond.  His lands included Vitré, Lohéac, Montfort, Becherel, Quintin, and La Roche-Bernard.  In 1527 he had ordered 162 people being directly paid within his household, and biographers estimated that there were on average 300 people at his court on any given day. For a time, he hosted a representative of the King of Portugal, who came with gifts for Guy.  Guy was a strong patron of the arts, and he also enjoyed jousting.  At the tournament celebrating the arrival of Mary Tudor in Paris, he jousted over 40 times.

Marriages and family 
Guy XVI first married Charlotte of Naples on 10 Jun 1500.  This marriage was arranged by his cousin, Anne of Brittany.  Their children included:
 François (1503-1522 at the Battle of Bicocca)
 Catherine (1504-1526), who married Claude I de Rieux.  Their daughter became Guyonne, Countess of Laval from 1547 to 1567.
 Anne de Laval (1505-1554), who married François II de La Trémoille
His first wife died in 1506.  In 1517, he married Anne de Montmorency, sister of the Constable of France with the same name.  Their children included:
 Claude (1522-1547), who inherited the title as Guy XVII (r 1531–1547)
 Marguerite, who married Louis V of Rohan
 Anne de Laval, who married Louis de Silly
His second wife died in 1525.  Some time after that, he married Antoinette de Daillon.  They had at least one daughter:
 Charlotte, who married Gaspard II de Coligny

Ancestry

References 

Works cited

15th-century Breton people
Counts of France
House of Laval
1476 births
1531 deaths